Peter De Clercq (Oudenaarde, 2 July 1966) is a Belgian former professional road bicycle racer. In the 1992 Tour de France, De Clercq was the winner of the 20th stage.

Major results

1987
Internationale Wielertrofee Jong Maar Moedig
Circuit du Hainaut
1988
Aartrijke
Ninove
Temse
1989
Heusden Limburg
1990
Ruddervoorde
1991
Grote Prijs Stad Zottegem
1992
A Travers le Morbihan
Route Adélie
Mere
Tour de France:
Winner stage 20
1993
Deinze
1994
A Travers le Morbihan
Deinze
Nokere Koerse
La Louvière
1995
Grand Prix de Rennes
1996
Zwevezele

External links 

Official Tour de France results for Peter De Clercq

1966 births
Living people
Belgian male cyclists
Belgian Tour de France stage winners
People from Oudenaarde
Cyclists from East Flanders